An atrioventricular fistula is a fistula between an atrium and a ventricle of the heart.
Formation of an AVF is a potential complication of catheter ablation.

References

Heart diseases